Night Raiders is a 2021 Canadian-New Zealand science fiction dystopian film written and directed by Danis Goulet. The film stars Elle-Máijá Tailfeathers, Brooklyn Letexier-Hart, Alex Tarrant, Amanda Plummer and Violet Nelson. Taika Waititi serves as an executive producer.

The film had its worldwide premiere at the 71st Berlin International Film Festival in March 2021.

Synopsis
Set in a dystopian version of North America in the year 2044, the film centres on Niska (Elle-Máijá Tailfeathers), a Cree woman who joins a resistance movement to the military government in order to save her daughter.

Cast
 Elle-Máijá Tailfeathers as Niska
 Brooklyn Letexier-Hart as Waseese
 Alex Tarrant as Leo
 Amanda Plummer as Roberta
 Violet Nelson as Somonis
 Gail Maurice as Ida

Production
The film, a coproduction of companies from Canada and New Zealand, is executive produced by Taika Waititi. Goulet has described the film as inspired in part by Alfonso Cuarón's 2006 film Children of Men, as well as by the military response to the Dakota Access Pipeline protests on the Standing Rock Indian Reservation in 2016; in addition, the film functions in part as an allegory for the Indian residential school system.

The film was shot in the Toronto area in 2019. It was originally slated for commercial release in 2020, but was postponed to 2021 following production delays caused by the COVID-19 pandemic.

Release
On February 10, 2021, Berlinale announced that the film would have its worldwide premiere at the 71st Berlin International Film Festival in the Panorama section, in March 2021. It had its Canadian premiere at the 2021 Toronto International Film Festival, and is scheduled to screen as the opening film of the 2021 ImagineNATIVE Film and Media Arts Festival.

It premiered commercially in October 2021, with the widest opening of any film by an indigenous director in Canadian film history. It was later released on TVOD platform in 2022.

Reception 
The film was mostly well-received by critics, who praised its cast and storytelling. However, the film was also criticized for its reliance on tropes of YA fiction. On the review aggregator website Rotten Tomatoes, the film has an 83% approval rating, based on 48 reviews, with an average rating of 7.1/10. The website's consensus reads, "Night Raiders strikes grim parallels between its dystopian setting and the present, offering a disturbing reminder that the horrors of the past are often very much still with us."

The film was named to TIFF's annual year-end Canada's Top Ten list for 2021.

Awards

References

External links
 

Canadian post-apocalyptic films
New Zealand post-apocalyptic films
English-language Canadian films
First Nations films
2021 science fiction films
Samuel Goldwyn Films films
2020s English-language films
2020s Canadian films
2020s New Zealand films
2021 directorial debut films